The Board of Intermediate and Secondary Education, Mymensingh is an autonomous organization that is responsible for holding public examinations (Junior School Certificate (J.S.C.), Secondary School Certificate (S.S.C.), and Higher Secondary (School) Certificate (H.S.C)) in four districts of Mymensingh Division.

District under Mymensingh Education Board
Jamalpur District
Mymensingh District
Netrokona District
Sherpur District

See also
 List of Education Boards in Bangladesh

References 

Education in Bangladesh
Education Board in Bangladesh